Nightmare Circus (also known as Barn of the Naked Dead or Terror Circus) is a 1974 horror film directed by Alan Rudolph, who took over production after the first few days were handled by producer Gerald Cormier. The film was co-written by Cormier and Roman Valenti.

Plot

Three showgirls head to Las Vegas for work when their car breaks down.  Andre (Andrew Prine) offers to help them and takes them to his place, where he keeps women confined in chains, barefoot, and makes them perform circus tricks in his barn. His father, who has become a homicidal mutant because of the homestead's proximity to a nuclear power plant, lives next to them in a shed.

Cast
Andrew Prine as Andre
Manuela Thiess as Simone
Sherry Alberoni as Sheri
Gyl Roland as Corinne
Sheila Bromley as Mrs. Baynor
Gil Lamb as Mr. Alvarez
Al Cormier as Sheriff Stanford
Chuck Niles as Derek Moore
Jeane Manson as Jean

Reception

DVD Verdict negatively reviewed the film, commenting that it was "just dull and dumb". In the book Cult Horror Films Welch Everman criticized the movie's attempt to contain what he saw as "phony feminism", as he felt that it was added as a way to allow viewers to enjoy the movie's violence against its female protagonists and "not feel guilty afterwards".
AllMovie gave the film a negative review complimenting the film's premise, but criticized the film's failure at delivering the "kinky delights" it promised, slow pacing, and lack of character development, calling the film an "amateurish mess of sex fantasy and nuclear horror".

Home video
The film was first released on DVD by Legend House LLC on January 29, 2008. It was later re-released by Shriek Show and Code Red on March 31, 2009 and September 27, 2011, respectively, with Code Red releasing the film as a double feature alongside the 1981 horror film Scream under its Barn of the Naked Dead title.

See also
 List of American films of 1974

References

External links 

1970s English-language films
American horror films
1970s exploitation films
1974 films
1974 horror films
Films directed by Alan Rudolph
1970s American films